Stage 12 of the 2007 Giro d'Italia took place on 24 May; the race concluded on 3 June. The second half of the Giro began with a challenging mountain stage that finished outside Italy, the first of three stages in this Giro that did so. This stage resulted in the race lead transferring from Andrea Noè to his teammate and team leader Danilo Di Luca, who did not relinquish this lead and finished the race as its champion.

The battle for the other two spots on the Giro podium also began in stage 12 but was not resolved until later in the race. Andy Schleck from  won the white jersey in Milan as the Giro's best rider under 25, and was in a competition with Eddy Mazzoleni, Gilberto Simoni, Damiano Cunego, and Riccardo Riccò to see who would round out the podium with Di Luca. It was in the marquee stages of the second half of the race that Schleck and Mazzoleni distinguished themselves as podium favorites, eventually finishing the race second and third overall, respectively.  showed well, with Riccò and Simoni both taking mountain stage wins and Leonardo Piepoli winning the green jersey in Milan as the Giro's best climber.

Alessandro Petacchi from  won two stages in the second half of the Giro, and the points classification, but his subsequent disqualification for a non-negative salbutamol test given earlier in the race nullified these victories.

Stage 12
24 May 2007 – Scalenghe to Briançon (France), 

This was the first major mountain stage of the Giro. The course included two difficult first-category climbs, as the route passed from Italy into France. The first of these climbs was the Colle dell'Agnello, which crested just inside the French border. This was the Cima Coppi, the highest climb in the race. The Col d'Izoard later on is only marginally shorter and less steep, reaching  in elevation after  on the road, for a steady 7.1% gradient. The finish came on a steep descent into Briançon, a popular host town for the Tour de France.

By the  mark, the duo had a 17 and a half minute advantage on the peloton, as the other riders were conserving themselves for the big climbs ahead. The  team, and in particular Leonardo Piepoli, did the pacemaking on the ascent of the Colle dell'Agnello, and after a few kilometers of the climb only a select group of overall favorites remained together as the first chase group. One surprising rider to crack was two-time Giro winner Paolo Savoldelli, who lost contact with the group of favorites  from the summit of the Agnello and lost five minutes to them at day's end. Savoldelli was still hurt from the previous day's crash, and informed his lieutenant Eddy Mazzoleni that he should keep the pace for as long as he could and ride his own race, and that Savoldelli would look after himself.

In the front of the race, Le Boulanger was the first over the Agnello, winning the prize that went with conquering the Cima Coppi. Riblon followed 1'30" behind him; the group of overall favorites was still 13 minutes behind at the summit of the climb. Piepoli's pacemaking on the ascent had succeeded in whittling the group down to just himself, Gilberto Simoni, Damiano Cunego, Danilo Di Luca, Mazzoleni, Andy Schleck, and Stefano Garzelli. Riccardo Riccò, Savoldelli, Yaroslav Popovych, and overnight race leader Andrea Noè had all been in this group at the beginning of the climb, but were all eventually cracked by the pace.

Piepoli continued to pull the Simoni group through the descent from the Agnello and the beginning of the Iozard climb, absorbing Riblon in the process. Le Boulanger was alone in the front of the race as the ascent of the Iozard began, 3 minutes ahead of Simoni's group. With  left in the climb, Piepoli broke away from the group he had been pacing, in a move to see who could match his acceleration. Di Luca and Schleck quickly made the bridge, with Simoni holding their wheels, but Cunego and Garzelli did not react as quickly and had to expend more energy to stay with the leaders. Later, Garzelli was dropped by this group's pace, and lost 2 minutes to them at the finish line. This group caught Le Boulanger  before the summit of the Iozard.

Seconds before reaching that summit, Di Luca attacked from the leading group and came free, taking maximum mountains points and, more importantly, opening up a time gap. He opened up a 13-second lead on Schleck, Simoni, and Mazzoleni, and 25 to Cunego. Piepoli faded further and out of contention, at last hitting the wall after doing some strenuous pacemaking for much of this difficult stage. Simoni's descending skills brought himself, Schleck, and Mazzoleni back together with Di Luca minutes later, and they were together in Briançon for the stage finish. Di Luca attacked for the stage win  from the finish line, after a sharp right-hand turn, and drew Schleck with him. Simoni went à bloc in his attempt to reach them, and did pass Schleck, but could not come around Di Luca, who won the stage. The others in the leading group of five finished scattered behind them. 's Marzio Bruseghin, who had begun the day second in the overall standings, was in the second chase group most of the day and finished 2'33" back, retaining second overall. Noè was 9'45" off the pace and surrendered the pink jersey to his team leader Di Luca. Di Luca still held the green jersey as mountains classification leader after the stage; Piepoli wore it in the next three stages.

Stage 13
25 May 2007 – Biella to Santuario di Oropa,  (individual time trial)

The Giro's first individual time trial consisted entirely of the first-category climb to the Santuario di Oropa. The route was uphill all the way, gaining  at an average gradient of 5.8%, with the steepest stretches reaching 13%. Though noted to be a difficult climb, it was expected that the short length of this stage would limit its effect on the overall standings.

The first rider of the day to post a time under 30 minutes was 's Julio Alberto Pérez. His 29'38" was eventually bettered by American time trial specialist David Zabriskie, who stopped the clock at 29'14". Leonardo Piepoli started slowly, well behind Zabriskie at the  intermediate time check, but finished strongly, gaining 4 seconds on Zabriskie at the  check and 18 at the finish line. ' Evgeni Petrov posted the best time at the first intermediate time check, but faded as the course wore on and could not beat Piepoli's time. Riccardo Riccò, Franco Pellizotti, Andy Schleck, Damiano Cunego, and Gilberto Simoni all posted solid times, but all fell short of overtaking Piepoli.

The last two men to take the course were Italian national time trial champion Marzio Bruseghin and race leader Danilo Di Luca. Bruseghin had the second best splits at the first two intermediate time checks and gained against Piepoli in the final  where the others had lost time to him, winning the stage by a single second. Di Luca also rode well, finishing 8 seconds back of Bruseghin, and gaining time on his major rivals. After the stage, Simoni expressed disappointment that Piepoli was so narrowly defeated after having worked so hard the day before. Bruseghin held second overall after the stage and slightly narrowed his time gap to Di Luca, but made it clear that his focus going forward would be to work for team leader Cunego and not for any individual aspirations.

Stage 14
26 May 2007 – Cantù to Bergamo, 

The first  of this stage were flat, but two categorized climbs followed. The second-category Passo di San Marco and the third-category La Trinità-Dossena had a  descent between them. Though a flat stretch followed to the finish, it was not likely that any sprinters would be present in the leading group to contest the stage.

The morning breakaway numbered eleven. During the flat stretch before the Passo di San Marco climb, Stefano Garzelli tried to use his team to soften the main field so he could attack and bridge up to the leaders, but team , working for race leader Danilo Di Luca, nullified the move.

The group thinned after cresting the climb, leaving only Iván Parra, Paolo Bettini, and Fortunato Baliani just less than two minutes ahead of the pink jersey group, which contained all of the race's overall favorites. Garzelli and teammate Massimo Codol came free of this group on the ascent of La Trinità-Dossena and drew Gilberto Simoni and the powerful  duo of Eddy Mazzoleni and Paolo Savoldelli with them. The three breakaway riders were able to stay with them, forming a leading group of seven, after Codol dropped after doing some strenuous pacemaking. They built a 30-second advantage over the pink jersey group, as Liquigas was spent from their earlier effort to keep the race together. They kept their advantage over the other race favorites at that level for most of the stage, contesting a sprint finish among themselves 38 seconds ahead of Di Luca in eighth. Garzelli passed him up with  left and won his first Giro stage in three years. Simoni moved up from eighth to fifth after the stage, and several time gaps tightened with the day's results.

Stage 15
27 May 2007 – Trento to Tre Cime di Lavaredo, 

This was the Giro's queen stage, featuring four categorized climbs along with an uncategorized  wall early on.

After a flurry of morning attacks and counterattacks resulted in no group coming clear, the right combination formed after close to an hour and  covered. By the  mark, the 22-strong breakaway representing 17 teams had three minutes on the main field. Their advantage eventually grew to nearly seven minutes, but with such difficult parcours ahead, they stood little chance of staying away.

After  on the Passo di San Pellegrino, the day's first climb,  sent Leonardo Piepoli and Riccardo Riccò on the attack. Iván Parra and Julio Alberto Pérez followed, and they quickly gapped the pink jersey group while trying to bridge up to the leaders. They reached the leading group after the descent of the San Pellegrino, holding four minutes on the pink jersey group at that time. Saunier Duval–Prodir rider David Cañada, part of the original big breakaway, set to the pacemaking once his two teammates joined the group, and tapped out a tempo that cracked about half of the group. When Cañada faded, Piepoli took his turn on the front of the group, at which time only Riccò, Pérez, Parra, and Michael Rasmussen were with him. Piepoli led them over the second-category Passo di Giau together, a little over three minutes ahead of the main field.

The pink jersey group was, during the Giau climb, some 50 riders strong until Paolo Savoldelli took a pull on the front, working for the better-placed Eddy Mazzoleni, that absolutely shattered it. Race leader Danilo Di Luca lost all of his support riders from the group, and overall contenders Damiano Cunego and Marzio Bruseghin were also quickly gapped. With  remaining to the summit of the Giau, Di Luca put in an attack that further broke up the field. Savoldelli was gapped for a time, but his aggressive descent from the Giau brought him back to the pink jersey group, where he again took a strenuous pull on the front, softening up the contenders enough for himself and Mazzoleni to break free.

The intermediate sprint in Cortina d'Ampezzo resulted in Rasmussen coming out the back of the leading group. Savoldelli and Mazzoleni caught him in the road, and the Dutchman stayed with them to form a three-man chase group. Rain began to fall on the ascent of the Passo Tre Croci, the day's third climb, making the goings even more difficult. The leading group of four had 1'24" on the Mazzoleni group at the top of Passo Tre Croci and a further three minutes on the pink jersey group, meaning Mazzoleni was very nearly the virtual race leader on the road. Mazzoleni dropped Savoldelli and Rasmussen as the stage went on, and finished five minutes before them.

On the last ascent of the day, the Tre Cime di Lavaredo, Di Luca made up much of the ground he had in deficit to Mazzoleni on the road, conceding a minute and 24 seconds to him at the finish line. Gilberto Simoni, Damiano Cunego, and Andy Schleck finished just behind him. In the front of the race, Riccò attacked as the Lavaredo climb began and quickly got a 15-second gap. The only rider to bridge to him was his teammate Piepoli. Piepoli, having taken the lead outright in the mountains classification, allowed Riccò the stage win. Their team leader Simoni reflected after the stage that he thought their early break was foolhardy, and that he had not followed because he was focused only on the overall and not stages, but that he was happy that the team took the Giro's marquee stage.

The true difficulty of the stage was demonstrated by the time gaps and finishing groups. Most of the riders finished the stage alone; no more than five finished together. Only 18 other riders finished within ten minutes of Riccò's winning time, and 78 lost more than half an hour, with 's Franck Rénier last on the day 40 minutes and 10 seconds off the pace.

Stage 16
29 May 2007 – Agordo to Lienz (Austria), 

After the second rest day, the Giro returned with a rolling stage that entered Austria. The stage began with the second-category Passo di Campolongo and a long descent from it, but the remaining terrain was not difficult enough for any riders to open up significant time gaps. Pre-race analysis thus found it to be an ideal stage for a winning breakaway.

The peloton's pace in this stage was extremely lax. Through the first hour, they covered only . The second hour was even slower, covering . No breakaways were attempted in this time, save for a quick sprint for the mountains points available on the Passo di Campolongo. Through three hours, there was still no breakaway.

Finally, with only  left in the stage, Benoît Joachim and Laurent Mangel came free. The  team at the head of the peloton was uninterested in chasing them down, since only a stage win was on offer this day, with the overall standings very unlikely to change. Little by little, sixteen others joined them. They did not work cohesively; Mangel, Stefano Garzelli, Ricardo Serrano, José Luis Rubiera, Pietro Caucchioli, and Pablo Lastras took two minutes' advantage over the other twelve. This mattered little, as the apathetic peloton let them all go to contest the stage amongst themselves. Garzelli put in an attack on the third-category Bannberg climb,  from the end of the race, and stayed out front for the stage win. The main field, led home by László Bodrogi, was 8 minutes and 10 seconds back, but there was no significant change to the overall classification.

Stage 17
30 May 2007 – Lienz (Austria) to Monte Zoncolan, 

This stage brought the riders back into Italy. It was short, but it ended at one of the most difficult climbs in the world, Monte Zoncolan. The Giro previously passed over the Zoncolan in 2003, in a stage won by Gilberto Simoni en route to overall victory.

Race leader Danilo Di Luca's  team covered many early breakaway attempts. After , a dozen-strong breakaway group formed. Their pace was frantic, coming to the stage's intermediate sprint 20 minutes faster than the fastest time predicted by Giro organizers. They had five and a half minutes on the pink jersey group containing race favorites at this point, and three and a half minutes on them at the beginning of the Zoncolan climb.

Jussi Veikkanen, Massimo Codol, and Mauricio Ardila took pulls at the front of the breakaway group, but  into the climb, only Dario Cioni, Fortunato Baliani, and Mario Aerts remained out front. Another kilometer later, Cioni was the lone leader. Franco Pellizotti was the last Liquigas rider left for Di Luca in the group of favorites, before he cracked and also fell off the pace. With  left in the climb, Simoni himself came to the front of the group and tapped out a pace that left everyone but teammate Leonardo Piepoli and best young rider Andy Schleck behind. They passed Cioni and chaser Codol on the road, and the  duo left the young Luxembourger behind them to contest the stage themselves. Since the climb had personal significance for Simoni, Piepoli allowed him to cross the line first. The win moved Simoni into a podium position, in third, and moved Schleck into second overall.

Stage 18
31 May 2007 – Udine to Riese Pio X, 

The 18th stage was completely flat, and was sure to be contested by the Giro's remaining sprinters.

A great number of early breakaways were attempted and neutralized in the stage's first hour. Finally, seven broke away at the  mark. The seven, Addy Engels, Maxim Gourov, Patxi Vila, Franck Rénier, Éric Berthou, Pedro Horrillo and Mikhail Ignatiev, got a maximum advantage of 2'30", but the peloton easily caught them  from the finish line.  tried to set up the sprint for Alexandre Usov, as did  for Matteo Tosatto, who lived in the town where the stage finished. AG2R's leadout train took a left-hand turn in the final kilometer too sharply, and left a handful of riders to contest the stage alone. Since the crash occurred within the final , no time was counted as lost. Alessandro Petacchi easily held off Maximiliano Richeze and Matti Breschel for the victory, though this was one of his many 2007 wins that was later stripped due to his irregular salbutamol levels in a test given earlier in the race. The overall standings were unchanged by the day's results.

Stage 19
1 June 2007 – Treviso to Terme di Comano, 

Two categorized climbs occurred on this course, but since the stage took place one day before a long and likely crucial individual time trial, pre-race analysis determined this stage likely to be decided by a breakaway.

A breakaway group involving double stage winner Stefano Garzelli got away after , but was brought back  later after never having more than 45 seconds on the main field. Iban Mayo and Alberto Losada counter-attacked when the original break was brought in, and stayed out front for much of the stage.  rode tempo through the  mark, until Leonardo Piepoli put in an attack for maximum mountains points on the second-category Pian del Fugazze. He was caught shortly thereafter, but the pace he set severely thinned the pink jersey group.

A chase group of five riders formed between the pink jersey group and Mayo and Losada in the front of the race, but they were never able to make the bridge. Losada cracked on the day's final climb and finished 4 minutes behind Mayo, the stage winner. Evgeni Petrov, who began the day in eighth place overall, was part of the chase group and gained sufficient time to move into seventh place at day's end.

Stage 20
2 June 2007 – Bardolino to Verona,  (individual time trial)

The race's second individual time trial was fairly straightforward, albeit long. It was mostly flat and did not have many turns in the road, thus favoring traditional time trial specialists for the stage win.

Mikhail Ignatiev set the first competitive time of the day. His 54'21" was almost two minutes better than the times that had come before him. Not long after came United States national time trial champion David Zabriskie, who bettered Ignatiev's time at all three intermediate time checks and was over a minute better than him at the finish, the first rider under 53 minutes on the day. Paolo Savoldelli came a little later and stopped the clock in 52'20".

Later on, the race's overall favorites took to the road not expressly for the stage win, but rather to iron out the race's overall standings. Savoldelli's teammate Eddy Mazzoleni rode one of the best time trials of his career, 2 seconds better than Zabriskie and 36 back of his teammate to move up from fifth to third overall. Damiano Cunego and Gilberto Simoni, both noted as relatively weak time trialists, lost out on their chances for the podium because of Mazzoleni's ride and settled among themselves the battle for fourth place. Cunego's 54'37" meant Simoni would have to come home better than 55'38" to stay better than his rival. Simoni's time was 55'03", and he remained ahead of Cunego. Danilo Di Luca and Andy Schleck also rode strong time trials, to preserve their places on top of the overall classification with a ceremonial final stage left to race.

Stage 21
3 June 2007 – Vestone to Milan, 

The final stage was flat, containing, per tradition, one early categorized climb. It ended with ten circuits on the Corso Venezia in Milan preceding a mass sprint finish.

Kurt Asle Arvesen and Daniele Contrini briefly broke away early in the stage, but they did not seriously seek to stay away. The peloton was together into Milan. Various breakaway attempts occurred on the Milan circuit, but none succeeded. Alessandro Petacchi won the resultant field sprint, though this was one of his many 2007 wins that was later stripped due to his irregular salbutamol levels in a test given earlier in the race. There were no significant changes to the race's standings, so Danilo Di Luca became the Giro champion.

References

2007 Giro d'Italia
Giro d'Italia stages